James Alexander Corry  (1899 – December 26, 1985) was a Canadian academic and the thirteenth Principal of Queen's University, Ontario, from 1961 until 1968.

Born in Millbank, Ontario, he graduated in 1923 from the University of Saskatchewan. He attended Lincoln College, Oxford as a Rhodes Scholar. In 1927 he became a  professor of law at the University of Saskatchewan. In 1936 he joined Queen's University as a professor of political science. In 1957, when the Queen's Faculty of Law was re-established with his assistance, he was one of the three charter professors, along with Daniel Soberman and Stuart Ryan. From 1951 until 1961 he was a Vice-Principal of Queen's. Mackintosh-Corry Hall at Queen's is co-named in his honour.

Honours
 He was a Fellow of the Royal Society of Canada.
 He received honorary degrees from 14 universities, including Sir George Williams University (1973), which later became Concordia University.
 In 1968 he was made a Companion of the Order of Canada.

References

 
 

1899 births
1985 deaths
Canadian legal scholars
Canadian political scientists
Canadian Rhodes Scholars
Companions of the Order of Canada
Fellows of the Royal Society of Canada
Principals of Queen's University at Kingston
Academic staff of the Queen's University at Kingston
University of Saskatchewan alumni
Academic staff of the University of Saskatchewan
Presidents of the Canadian Political Science Association
20th-century political scientists